Lisinopril/hydrochlorothiazide, sold under the brand name Zestoretic among others, is a fixed-dose combination medication used for the treatment of high blood pressure. It contains lisinopril, an ACE inhibitor, and hydrochlorothiazide, a diuretic. Typically, it becomes an option once a person is doing well on the individual components. It is taken by mouth.

Common side effects include dizziness, headache, cough, and feeling tired. Severe side effects may include angioedema and low blood pressure. Use during pregnancy may harm the baby.

The combination was approved for medical use in the United States in 1989. It is on the World Health Organization's List of Essential Medicines. It is available as a generic medication. In 2020, it was the 50th most commonly prescribed medication in the United States, with more than 13million prescriptions.

References

External links
 

Antihypertensive agents
Combination drugs
AstraZeneca brands
Wikipedia medicine articles ready to translate
World Health Organization essential medicines